Lamba is a city in Kwilu province, Democratic Republic of the Congo. It has an estimated population of 9,930.

References

Populated places in Kwilu Province